Eretz is  Hebrew for "land", "country" (with the definite article, HaAretz ("the land")

In particular, it may refer to:
 HaAretz HaMuvtahat, the "Promised Land"
 Eretz Israel, the Land of Israel
 Haaretz, originally Hadashot Ha'Aretz  "News of the Land", Israeli newspaper

See also
 Am ha'aretz, "people of the land", i.e. "natives" or "pagans"